Al-Tersana, meaning Arsenal, may refer to:

Tersana, an Egyptian football club
Al Tersana (Tripoli), a Libyan football club